Autolite or Auto-Lite is an American brand of spark plugs and ignition wire sets.  Autolite products are sold in the United States, Canada, Mexico, and Australia.  Until 2011, the Autolite brand was a part of Honeywell's automotive Consumer Products Group, along with FRAM and Prestone.  Since then, it has been manufactured and marketed by FRAM Group. Autolite has been the official spark plug of NASCAR since April 2000.

History
The origins of Autolite are traced to 1911, when Electric Autolite was founded. The company produced generators to power early day buggy lamps. In 1927, Electric Autolite acquired the Prest-O-Lite Battery Company from The Union Carbide Corporation which produced automotive batteries. In 1934 an Autolite facility in Toledo, Ohio was the site of the Auto-Lite strike. In 1935, Royce G. Martin, President of the Electric Autolite Company, decided the company should enter the business of manufacturing spark plugs. Robert Twells, a ceramic engineer, led the development team. In 1936 the first spark plug was produced at their Fostoria, Ohio plant.  A few months later, the company sold their first spark plug. Electric Autolite's products were expanded further to include starter motors, ignition systems, and wire and cable products. Autolite had secured supply contracts with leading car manufacturers such as Chrysler, Studebaker, and Packard.

In a 1940 promotional film, Autolite featured stop motion animation of its products marching past Autolite factories to the tune of Franz Schubert's Military March. An abbreviated version of this sequence was later used in television ads for Autolite. Announcer Harlow Wilcox turned the ad's tagline "You're always right with Autolite!" into a national catchphrase.

In 1961, the Ford Motor Company acquired the Autolite trade name, an Ohio spark plug factory, a Michigan battery facility, limited distribution rights, and the services of several employees. Autolite products became standard original factory equipment in Ford vehicles. A federal antitrust lawsuit was filed against Ford, which dragged on through the remainder of the 1960s, ultimately being decided in 1972 by the Supreme Court against Ford, and Ford was forced to sell its Autolite-related assets to the Bendix Corporation by 1973. At that point, Ford replaced the Autolite brand with the Motorcraft name worldwide for its original factory equipment, which is still in use by Ford to this day.

In 1963, the portion of the Autolite company which was not acquired by Ford merged with the Mergenthaler Linotype Company, and the Eltra Corporation was formed. The former Autolite portion became the Prestolite Motor and Ignition Company, later Prestolite Electric. In 1973, the Bendix Corporation had purchased both FRAM and Autolite. In 1980, the Eltra Corporation was acquired by Allied Signal Corporation which was itself acquired by Honeywell in 1999. Bendix was acquired by Allied in 1983, thereby bringing Autolite back to its original parent, Electric Autolite (Eltra) as part of Allied Signal (Honeywell).  In 2011, Honeywell sold its automotive Consumer Products Group to Rank Group, which introduced FRAM Group and several other companies to take over the operations and the transfer of ownership of the acquired trademarks.

See also
 Auto-Lite strike

References

External links
 Autolite

Auto parts suppliers of the United States
American companies established in 1911
Companies based in Lake Forest, Illinois
Carburetor manufacturers
Bendix Corporation